La Sept was a French free-to-air television network and production company created on 23 February 1986 to develop cultural and educational programming for transmission via the TDF 1 satellite. In French, the word "sept" means the number seven; it not only represents the seventh network to have signed on in France, but it also serves as a backronym, for Société d'édition de programmes de télévision (Television Programme Production Corporation).

History

In 1985, Georges Fillioud, French Minister of Transport, charged Pierre Desgraupes with creating programmes for one or more of the five channels of the high power satellite TDF 1 launched in 1988. On 27 February 1986, La Société d'édition de programmes de télévision was created by Bernard Faivre d'Arcier, cultural adviser to the Prime Minister Laurent Fabius and began to develop a stock of programmes. It was chaired by historian George Duby.

In March 1989, the full name of La Sept changed, becoming La Société européenne de programmes de télévision (European Television Programme Corporation). In April 1989, the Conseil supérieur de l'audiovisuel granted permission to broadcast on one of TDF 1's channels, and it began transmission on 14 May 1989. The station broadcast three hours and 30 minutes of programmes per day, each programme broadcast twice. In June, an agreement was reached to broadcast La Sept's programmes on cable television, and on 3 February 1990, FR3 gave the La Sept a window on their terrestrial broadcast channel every Saturday from 15:00 to midnight.

On 30 May 1992, La Sept lost its role of broadcaster to Arte, a Franco-German EEIG group created on 2 October 1990. On 27 September 1993 it changed its name to Sept-ARTE, and became ARTE France on 1 August 2000.

Soundtrack
Michael Nyman released a promotional album, La Sept, containing music recorded for the network.

References

Defunct television channels in France
Television channels and stations established in 1986
Television channels and stations disestablished in 1992
1986 establishments in France
1992 disestablishments in France
Mass media in Paris